Joseph Hawley may refer to:

Joseph Hawley (captain) (1603–1690), American settler
Joseph Hawley (Massachusetts politician) (1723–1788), colonial and Revolutionary lawyer and legislator
Sir Joseph Henry Hawley, 3rd Baronet (1813–1875), English racehorse owner and breeder
Joseph Roswell Hawley (1826–1905), Governor of Connecticut, U.S. Senator and Congressman
Joe Hawley (born 1988), American football player
Joe Hawley, American musician of the band Tally Hall